Orange Sky Golden Harvest (OSGH) , previously known as Golden Harvest from 1970 to 2009, is a film production, distribution, and exhibition company based in Hong Kong. It dominated Hong Kong cinema box office sales from the 1970s to the 1980s, and played a major role in introducing Hong Kong action films to the world, especially those by Bruce Lee (Concord Production Inc.), Jackie Chan, and Sammo Hung.

History
Notable names in the company include its founders, the veteran film producers Raymond Chow and Leonard Ho.  Chow and Ho were executives with Hong Kong's top studio Shaw Brothers but left in 1970 to form their own studio.  They succeeded by taking a different approach from the highly centralised Shaw model. Golden Harvest contracted with independent producers and gave talent more generous pay and greater creative freedom.  Some filmmakers and actors from Shaw Brothers defected.  But what really put the company on the map was a 1971 deal with soon-to-be martial arts superstar Bruce Lee with the film The Big Boss, after he had turned down the low-paying standard contract offered him by the Shaws. Golden Harvest's films with Lee were the first Hong Kong films to reach a large worldwide audience.

In 1973, Golden Harvest entered into a pioneering co-production with Hollywood for the English-language Bruce Lee film, Enter the Dragon, a worldwide hit made with the Warner Brothers studio and Concord Production Inc.

Following Lee's death, Golden Harvest found success with the Hui Brothers' comedies such as Games Gamblers Play (1974), The Last Message (1975), The Private Eyes (1976), The Contract (1978) and Security Unlimited (1981). The studio supplanted Shaw Brothers as Hong Kong's dominant studio by the end of the 1970s and retained that position into the 1990s. 

Golden Harvest developed a worldwide film distribution operation and started producing films for an international market and had released eight by 1980, including The Amsterdam Kill (1978) starring Robert Mitchum and The Boys in Company C (1978) directed by Sidney J. Furie. It also released Jackie Chan's first film for the international market, The Big Brawl (1980), although it did not match the success of Enter the Dragon. In 1981, The Cannonball Run was a big hit. The studio also made Tom Selleck's first two films with him in a starring role, High Road to China (1983) and Lassiter (1984). Following the disappointing performance of these and others, Golden Harvest quietly withdrew from the US market.

From the 1980s until very recently, the studio produced almost all of the films of Jackie Chan, the studio's greatest asset for years. Golden Harvest has also produced a number of films with Jet Li, Cynthia Rothrock and Donnie Yen. 

Starting in 1990, Golden Harvest had a big international success again with the Teenage Mutant Ninja Turtles trilogy.

In 1992, Golden Village, a 50:50 joint venture between Golden Harvest and Village Roadshow of Australia was set up to develop and operate modern, multiplex cinemas in Singapore. In 1993, Golden Harvest sold its film library to Star TV.

Golden Harvest was listed on the Hong Kong Stock Exchange in 1994.

Golden Harvest's activity has declined since the death of Leonard Ho in 1998. In 2003, they withdrew from film-making to concentrate on film financing, distribution, and cinema management in Hong Kong and in Mainland China.

In 2004, Li Ka-shing and EMI became shareholders of the company. In 2007, Raymond Chow sold the company to Chinese businessman Wu Kebo, who owns the China-based Orange Sky Entertainment Group. In early 2009, Golden Harvest merged with Orange Sky and was renamed Orange Sky Golden Harvest. From 2009 to 2011 it was operated by Kelvin Wu King Shiu who become the CEO of the company. At that time Golden Harvest announced their relaunch and previewed a new trailer set for movies in 2010.

In October 2017, Golden Harvest acquired the other 50% stake of Golden Village from its joint venture partner, Village Roadshow, and therefore having full ownership of Golden Village. This was after a prior bid by Singapore-based media mini-conglomerate MM2 Asia to acquire the Village Roadshow stake in June 2017, as Village Roadshow failed to secure the approval of Golden Harvest. It is unknown whether the Village name will be dropped from Golden Village as a result of the acquisition.

Cinemas

Orange Sky Golden Harvest has cinemas not only in Hong Kong, but also in Mainland China, Taiwan, and Singapore.  Most of these are joint ventures. Golden Village, now fully owned by Orange Sky Golden Harvest, was a former joint venture with Village Roadshow responsible for the operation of Gold Class cinemas and Asia's first multiplex.

In Malaysia, the group was instrumental in the formation of the country's two largest cinema chains: Golden Screen Cinemas, a joint venture with Malaysia's PPB Group who bought out Golden Harvest's stake for full ownership, and TGV Cinemas (formerly Tanjong Golden Village), a joint venture with Tanjong of Malaysia and Village Roadshow of Australia, the former having bought out the remaining stakes for full ownership.

The company has recently acquired Warner Village in Taiwan.

Films produced

See also

Cinema of Hong Kong
Hong Kong action cinema
Mei Ah Entertainment

References
 Bordwell, David.  Planet Hong Kong: Popular Cinema and the Art of Entertainment.  Cambridge, MA: Harvard University Press, 2000.  
 Teo, Stephen. Hong Kong Cinema: The Extra Dimensions. London: British Film Institute, 1997. 
 Yang, Jeff.  Once Upon a Time in China: A Guide to Hong Kong, Taiwanese, and Mainland Chinese Cinema.  New York: Atria, 2003.

Notes

External links

 http://www.goldenharvest.com

Cinema chains in Hong Kong
Film production companies of Hong Kong
 
1994 initial public offerings
Film distributors of China
Companies listed on the Hong Kong Stock Exchange
Mass media companies established in 1970
1970 establishments in Hong Kong
Kowloon